Lutheran Church in Norway (Den lutherske kirke i Norge) is a small confessional Lutheran Church body in Norway. It is a member of International Lutheran Council.

References

External links 
http://lkn.no/

Christian organizations established in 2006
International Lutheran Council members
Lutheran denominations
Churches in Norway